How to Love Animals: In a Human-Shaped World is a book by British writer Henry Mance, published in the US by Viking in July 2021. Favorably commented in the Financial Times, The Guardian, and The Telegraph, the book denounces the thoughtless but profound suffering caused each day to millions of individual animals worldwide during the raising and slaughtering of livestock that takes place, allegedly for the sole purpose of bringing nutritionally superfluous meat to the plates of the dominant species, and thus please their pretentious palates. Mance advocates an ethic of compassion towards other species, including a vegan diet and a low-impact lifestyle.

References

2021 non-fiction books
British books
English-language books
Viking Press books